Cheerful Sensibility is the first studio album by South Korean band F.T. Island, released on 5 June 2007. The album contains 13 songs divided into two sections: "Emotional Chapter" consists of rock ballads, while "F.T. Island Chapter" is made up of pop-rock songs written by Japanese composers. The album sold 79,000 copies and became the sixth most sold album of the year in South Korea. It was re-released on 3 December by the title The Refreshment, with three new songs. The package included a Music 2.0 program, which enabled changes to the levels of vocals and instruments. It sold 25,724 copies.

Track list

Notes

References

 

2007 albums
Pop rock albums by South Korean artists
FNC Entertainment albums
F.T. Island albums
Korean-language albums